The 1984–85 Dayton Flyers men's basketball team represented the University of Dayton during the 1984–85 NCAA Division I men's basketball season. The Flyers, led by head coach Don Donoher, played their home games at the University of Dayton Arena and were an NCAA independent. Dayton received a bid to the NCAA tournament as No. 9 seed in the Southeast region. They were defeated by No. 8 seed Villanova, 51–49, in the opening round. and finished the season 19–10. Villanova would go on to complete one of the most famous Cinderella runs in tournament history as they won the National championship. To this date, Villanova remains the lowest-seeded team to win the NCAA Tournament. For the second straight season, Dayton was knocked out of the NCAA Tournament by the eventual National champion.

Roster

Schedule and results

|-
!colspan=9 style=| Regular season

|-
!colspan=9 style=| NCAA Tournament

Rankings

References

Dayton Flyers men's basketball seasons
Dayton
Dayton
Dayton
Dayton